Gaillard T. Hunt (September 8, 1862 – March 20, 1924) was an American author and civil servant.

Gaillard Hunt is notable because several of his works have been republished, in electronic form.
Available works include:
"The Debates in the Federal Convention of 1787"
"The Department of State of the United States: Its History and Functions" (1914)

References

External links

1862 births
1924 deaths
American male non-fiction writers
American historians